XHLS-FM is a radio station on 99.5 FM in Guadalajara. The station is owned by MegaRadio and carries a romantic music format known as Romance 99.5.

History
XHLS received its first concession on December 13, 1973.

References

Radio stations in Guadalajara
Radio stations established in 1973